The Men's freestyle 57 kg wrestling competitions at the 2022 Commonwealth Games in Birmingham, England took place on 6 August at the Coventry Arena. A total of 10 competitors from 10 nations took part. Pakistani athlete Ali Asad failed his dope test and was stripped of his bronze medal, and Suraj Singh from New Zealand was upgraded to bronze.

Results
The draw is as follows:

Repechage

References

External link
 Results
 

Wrestling at the 2022 Commonwealth Games